Ján Čirik (born 30 December 1982) is a Slovak football defender who currently plays for FK Slovan Duslo Šaľa. His former club was the Corgoň Liga club FC Nitra.

External links
at astrencin.sk
at fkduslosala.sk

References

1982 births
Living people
Slovak footballers
Association football defenders
AS Trenčín players
FK Inter Bratislava players
FC Nitra players
Slovak Super Liga players
FK Slovan Duslo Šaľa players